Daniel Elbittar Villegas (born April 30, 1979), is a Venezuelan actor, model and singer, considered one of the 50 Most Beautiful TV, is also famous for acting in telenovelas.

Personal life 
Elbittar has been married since 2014 to Venezuelan actress Sabrina Seara, with whom he has a son born in 2016.

Career

Musical career 
Elbittar began his career as a singer in the Venevisión series La calle de los sueños, before this was called by the band Calle Ciega to be part of the band, but this rejected the work. Then he played some songs for the telenovela Más que amor, frenesí. After this he was away from the musical field for several years. In 2014 he signed a contract with Sony Music Mexico and Azteca Records to launch their album "Quiero decirte" which was produced by José Miguel Velásquez. In that same year confirms its tour by Mexico, United States, Puerto Rico, Dominican Republic, Venezuela and Argentina. The first single from the album is entitled "Quiero decirte" which was part of the main theme of the telenovela Siempre Tuya Acapulco. Three songs from the album were by David Bisbal and the rest of the songs by José Miguel Velásquez. In 2016, he released his single "Y estoy vivo" produced in Mexico by Juan Carlos Moguel, a single that was part of the telenovela Entre tu amor y mi amor.

Acting 
Elbittar, began his career as an actor in 1998 in the Venezuelan telenovela produced by Venevisión Así es la vida, in 1999 he obtained the starring role of the telenovela La calle de los sueños. After a year out of television, in 2001 he participated in Más que amor, frenesí with Maritza Bustamante. Of there followed telenovelas such as Engañada, Negra consentida and Olvidarte jamás. He participates in several episodes of the series Decisiones, Lotería and Seguro y urgente. In 2007 he made his last telenovela in Venezuela for Radio Caracas Televisión, titled Camaleona. Which had problems during its transmission due to the problems of the closing of the channel.

In 2008 he moved from Miami to Mexico to sign a contract with TV Azteca. His first production in that company was the telenovela Tengo todo excepto a ti, which was more seen due to its character. In this company participated in several telenovelas such as Vidas robadas, Pecadora, La mujer de Judas and in the Reality Show La Isla.

In 2013 he debuted on American television in Find Me My Man, the show was broadcast on Oxygen on the NBC Universal Network.

In 2014 he starred in the telenovela Siempre tuya Acapulco, which was his last production for TV Azteca. While residing in Mexico was part of the play Mentiras, el musical, later confirmed that his contract with TV Azteca had ended on good terms.

In 2015 he returned to Venezuela to start the production of the telenovela Entre tu amor y mi amor. The telenovela premiered in June 2016, being the most viewed production of Venevisión in the schedule of 9 pm. In 2017 he debuted at the company Telemundo, in the telenovelas La Fan and his most recent project at the company Guerra de ídolos with whom he shares credits with Venezuelan actress Sheryl Rubio.

Filmography

Discography

Studio albums

Singles

References

External links 

1979 births
Living people
Venezuelan male models
Venezuelan male telenovela actors
Male actors from Caracas
20th-century Venezuelan male actors
21st-century Venezuelan male actors
21st-century Venezuelan male singers
Singers from Caracas